Baker, Donelson, Bearman, Caldwell & Berkowitz P.C. is a large U.S. law firm and lobbying group with offices in the Southeastern United States and Washington, D.C.   Fortune has selected Baker Donelson as one of the 100 Best Companies to Work For nine times, citing the firm's commitment to diversity, public service and pro bono work.

History
Baker, Donelson, Bearman, Caldwell & Berkowitz traces its roots back to the firm of Baker, Worthington, Crossley & Stansberry, founded in 1888 in Huntsville, Tennessee by James F. Baker.  James Baker's son, Howard Baker Sr., who served as a United States Representative from Tennessee, and his grandson, Howard Baker Jr., who served as majority leader of the United States Senate and White House Chief of Staff, were also lawyers at the firm.  Howard Baker Jr. was the last lawyer at the original Huntsville office, which closed after his death in 2014.

The current firm, headquartered in Memphis, is the result of a series of mergers of many different predecessor firms spread throughout the Southern United States.

Practice areas
In addition to its broad-based litigation practice, the firm has practices in corporate law, mergers & acquisitions, labor and employment, real estate, bankruptcy, health law, intellectual property, international business law, and tax law. It is also known as a large lobbying firm.

Notable lawyers and alumni
David Addington, former Chief of Staff to the Vice President of the United States under Dick Cheney.
Howard Baker Sr., former United States Representative from Tennessee.
Howard Baker Jr., former U.S. Senator and United States Ambassador to Japan, later Senior Counsel to the firm before his death in 2014.
Catherine Crosby, former Miss Alabama 2003.
Tom Daschle, former U.S. Senator and Senate Majority Leader.
Lewis Donelson, former member of the Memphis City Council and major figure within the Tennessee Republican Party.
James C. Duff, former director of the Administrative Office of the United States Courts.
Lawrence Eagleburger, former Secretary of State under George H. W. Bush, served as a foreign policy advisor to the firm.
Nancy Johnson, former Member, United States House of Representatives from the state of Connecticut.
Linda Klein, Immediate Past President of the American Bar Association.
Robb LaKritz, former Advisor to the Deputy Secretary of the United States Treasury, under George W. Bush. 
Ray Mabus, former Secretary of the Navy under Barack Obama, former Governor of the U.S. state of Mississippi from 1988 to 1992, and former United States Ambassador to Saudi Arabia from 1994 to 1996.
Tommy Parker, United States District Judge of the United States District Court for the Western District of Tennessee.
Ellen Tauscher, former Under Secretary of State for Arms Control and International Security Affairs, former Member, United States House of Representatives for California's 10th congressional district.
Joe D. Whitley, former General Counsel for the United States Department of Homeland Security.
Barbara Comstock, former Member, United States House of Representatives from the state of Virginia.

References

External links
 Baker, Donelson, Bearman, Caldwell & Berkowitz P.C. - Official Homepage
 Chambers USA profile
 Profile from LexisNexis Martindale-Hubbell
 National Law Review Profile

Law firms established in 1888
Companies based in Memphis, Tennessee
Lobbying firms
1888 establishments in Tennessee
Law firms based in Tennessee